The Old Erie Canal State Historic Park encompasses a  linear segment of the original Erie Canal's Long Level section. It extends westward from Butternut Creek in the town of DeWitt, just east of Syracuse, to the outskirts of Rome, New York. The park includes restored segments of the canal's waterway and towpath which were in active use between 1825 and 1917. It is part of the New York State Park system.

Access 

The towpath has been resurfaced with asphalt and stone dust and is suitable for biking, hiking, horseback riding or snowmobiling. The canal also is navigable by canoe or kayak for short segments throughout the park. All-terrain vehicles (ATVs) and motorcycles are not permitted, and no campsites are available in the park, although camping is available at Green Lakes State Park east of Syracuse, which is closely adjacent to Old Erie Canal State Park. Several picnic areas are available on the route and are accessible via nearby roads.

Route 

The  park lies within Madison, Oneida, and Onondaga counties. The park passes near or through several communities, including Fayetteville, Manlius Center, Kirkville, Chittenango, Canastota, Durhamville and New London.

 east of Butternut Creek, the canal passes by the entrance to Green Lakes State Park.

The park's terminus is at the Erie Canal Village, a now defunct privately operated museum and historic recreation of a 19th-century canal village located outside of Rome, which featured a  narrow gauge railway.

Connecting trails 
Other trails connecting with the Old Erie Canal towpath trail include:

 Butternut Creek Recreation and Nature Trail, DeWitt
 Fayetteville Feeder Towpath, Fayetteville
 Chittenango Creek Walk, Chittenango
 North Country Trail, Canastota (Concurrent east of Canastota to Rome)
 Oneida Rail Trail, Oneida
 Rome Canalway Towpath, Rome

Nearby parks 

Other parks, museums, and recreation areas along and nearby the Old Erie Canal State Historic Park include, from west to east:
 Ryder Park and Recreation Area, DeWitt
 Cedar Bay Park, DeWitt
 Canal Landing Park, Fayetteville
 Green Lakes State Park, Manlius
 Poolsbrook Picnic Area, Minoa
 Chittenango Landing Canal Boat Museum, Chittenango
 Duruss Conservancy, Oneida
 Verona Beach State Park, Verona
 Verona Park, Verona
 Lock 21 Park, New London, Oneida County
 Erie Canal Village, Rome

History 

In July 2006, stretches of the old canal within the park had to be dammed or drained to effect repairs on the aqueduct over Butternut Creek east of Syracuse, which was in danger of a potentially catastrophic leak due to unusually heavy rains.

In February 2010 the park was among about 40 New York State parks recommended for closure under Governor David Paterson's austerity budget plan. The park remains open.

See also 

 Chittenango Landing Dry Dock Complex
 Erie Canal Museum, Syracuse
 Erie Canalway National Heritage Corridor
 New York State Canalway Trail

References

External links

 
 Map of the Old Erie Canal State Historic Park
  Traces of the Erie Canal in the Old Erie Canal State Historic Park
 Erie Canal Village

DeWitt, New York
 
Historic sites in Onondaga County, New York
Manlius, New York
New York (state) historic sites
Parks in Madison County, New York
Parks in Oneida County, New York
Parks in Onondaga County, New York
State parks of New York (state)